Shashi Bhat is a Canadian writer, whose 2021 novel The Most Precious Substance on Earth was a shortlisted finalist for the Governor General's Award for English-language fiction at the 2022 Governor General's Awards.

Her debut novel, The Family Took Shape, was published in 2013. She was a finalist for the RBC Bronwen Wallace Award for Emerging Writers in 2010, and won the Journey Prize in 2018 for her short story "Mute".

Originally from Richmond Hill, Ontario, she is a graduate of Johns Hopkins University, and is currently a professor of creative writing at Douglas College.

References

External links

21st-century Canadian novelists
21st-century Canadian short story writers
21st-century Canadian women writers
Canadian women novelists
Canadian women short story writers
Canadian writers of Asian descent
Canadian people of Indian descent
Johns Hopkins University alumni
People from Richmond Hill, Ontario
Writers from Ontario
Writers from British Columbia
Living people
Year of birth missing (living people)